William Frank Jones, stage name Christopher Jones (August 18, 1941 – January 31, 2014), was an American stage, movie, and television actor.

Early life
He was born in Jackson, Tennessee, where his father was a grocery clerk and his mother, Robbie, was an artist. Jones's father and aunt admitted her to the state hospital in Bolivar, Tennessee, in 1945. Jones and his brother were then placed in Boys Town in Memphis, where he became a fan of James Dean after being told he bore a resemblance to him. He then joined the Army, but went AWOL, and after serving a sentence in a military prison, he moved to New York City, where he began his acting career. His mother died when he was 19.

Acting career
Jones (having adopted the stage name Christopher) made his Broadway debut on December 17, 1961, in Tennessee Williams's The Night of the Iguana, directed by Frank Corsaro and starring Shelley Winters. Winters introduced Jones to actress Susan Strasberg, the daughter of method acting progenitor Lee Strasberg. Jones studied at Strasberg's Actors Studio. Jones married Susan in 1965; the couple divorced in 1968. Their daughter, Jennifer Robin Jones, was born in 1966.

Moving to Hollywood, Jones was cast in the title role of ABC's television series The Legend of Jesse James, which ran for 34 episodes in the 1965–66 season. When the series ended, he accepted the title role in the movie Chubasco (1967) with Susan Strasberg playing his character's lover/wife. Their real marriage did not survive the filming, and they divorced in 1968.
Jones made a guest appearance in the fourth season episode of The Man from U.N.C.L.E. titled; 'The Test Tube Killer Affair' playing a programmed killer. 
Jones's next acting role, was rock star and presidential aspirant Max Frost in the influential cult film Wild in the Streets (1968), co-starring Shelley Winters, Hal Holbrook, and Richard Pryor. Later that same year, Jones appeared with Yvette Mimieux in the sex comedy Three in the Attic.

After two films in Europe with Pia Degermark—The Looking Glass War and Brief Season, both in 1970—Jones was cast by director David Lean in Ryan's Daughter (1970). The two men had a difficult relationship; this was the experience of many actors who worked with Lean. The problems intensified when production of the film took 12 months instead of the expected six, because Lean would wait for the right composition of clouds or the perfect storm to brew. Unbeknownst to Jones, he was drugged during his filming of Ryan's Daughter by Sarah Miles, according to her first autobiography, A Right Royal Bastard; this caused him to believe he was having a breakdown. Jones also was involved in a car crash, not knowing he had been drugged. The director and producers never informed him of the drugging. Later, Lean decided to have Julian Holloway re-record all of Jones' lines in post-production, a decision previously taken by Degermark for The Looking Glass War. Jones received poor notices anyway, which took a personal toll on the actor. Jones returned to California after filming ended, staying for a time in his manager's guest house, the cottage behind 10050 Cielo Drive, where Sharon Tate had been murdered, and abandoned his acting career. He engaged in a few long-term relationships, took up painting and sculpting, and lived quietly at the beach with his children.

Later life
Jones was offered the part of Zed in Pulp Fiction (1994) by director Quentin Tarantino, but he turned it down. He made a final screen appearance in crime comedy Mad Dog Time (1996) for his friend, director/actor Larry Bishop, who had appeared in Wild in the Streets. In his later years, Jones had a career as an artist and sculptor. His works included an oil painting of Rudolph Valentino that was displayed at the Hollywood Forever Cemetery.

Death
Jones died on January 31, 2014, at the age of 72, owing to complications arising from gallbladder cancer. He is survived by seven children, Jennifer Strasberg, Christopher Jones Jr., Jeromy McKenna, Delon Jones, Tauer Jones, Calin Jones, and Seagen Jones. He is interred at the Hollywood Forever Cemetery.

Rape allegation
When she was 18 years old, actress Olivia Hussey was allegedly raped by Jones in the house Roman Polanski had shared with his wife Sharon Tate, weeks after Tate's death. When she became pregnant, she had an abortion. Hussey had dated Jones in 1968 but ended the relationship because, she says, he was physically abusive toward her.

Filmography

References

External links

1941 births
2014 deaths
Male actors from Tennessee
American male film actors
American male television actors
People from Jackson, Tennessee
Military personnel from Tennessee
Deaths from cancer in California
Deaths from gallbladder cancer
Burials at Hollywood Forever Cemetery
20th-century American male actors